Sarah Anderson (born February 25, 1995) is an American curler from Broomall, Pennsylvania. Along with her twin sister Taylor, she was United States National Champion in 2019 and World Junior silver medalist in 2016.

Career

Juniors
Anderson was a member of Team USA at the 2012 Winter Youth Olympics, playing third on the team, which was skipped by Korey Dropkin. They finished in fifth place. In the mixed doubles event, Anderson was paired with South Korea's Go Ke-on. They lost their only match.

Anderson won the 2015 and 2016 United States Junior Curling Championships playing third for Cory Christensen. The team represented the United States at the World Junior Curling Championships both years. At the 2015 World Junior Curling Championships, the team lost in a tiebreaker, settling for fifth place. They had much more success at the 2016 World Junior Curling Championships, making it all the way to the gold medal final, where they lost to Canada.

Women's
Anderson made her debut at the United States Women's Curling Championship in 2013 skipping a team of Courtney Slata, Kathleen Dubberstein and Taylor Anderson (Sarah's twin sister). The team finished the event with a 2–7 record.  Anderson was named as the alternate player for Team USA at that year's World Championships. She would not play in any games, and the team finished fourth.

Anderson played in the 2014 United States Women's Curling Championship skipping a team of Slata (now Anderson-Slata), Taylor Anderson and Emily Anderson. The team finished with a 4–5 record.

In 2014, the Anderson twins joined the Christensen rink to play in both juniors and women's events. The team won a World Curling Tour (WCT) event in their first season, the 2014 Molson Cash Spiel. The team played in the 2015 United States Women's Curling Championship, finishing fourth. The next season the team won another WCT event, the 2015 St. Paul Cash Spiel. Later that season, they finished third at the 2016 United States Women's Curling Championship. The team won the St. Paul Cash Spiel again in 2016 and finished fifth at the 2017 United States Women's Curling Championship. In their last season together, the team finished 2nd at the 2018 United States Women's Curling Championship and was also one of three invited to the 2017 United States Olympic Curling Trials, where they finished last with just one win.

After the 2017–18 season, Sarah and Taylor Anderson joined the Jamie Sinclair rink. In their first season together, the team won the 2019 United States Women's Curling Championship and represented the U.S. at the 2019 World Women's Curling Championship, finishing with a 6–6 record.

Mixed doubles
Anderson has represented the United States twice in her career at the World Mixed Doubles Curling Championship. At the 2015 World Mixed Doubles Curling Championship with teammate Korey Dropkin, she finished second in her group (7–2 record), but lost in the quarterfinals. The pair also played in the 2018 World Mixed Doubles Curling Championship, where they went 6–1 in group play, but lost in the round of 16.

Personal life
Anderson attended Marple Newtown High School and the University of Minnesota. She currently lives in Minneapolis.

Teams

Women's

Mixed doubles

References

External links

Living people
1995 births
American female curlers
Curlers at the 2012 Winter Youth Olympics
Sportspeople from Philadelphia
Sportspeople from Delaware County, Pennsylvania
People from Marple Township, Pennsylvania
Sportspeople from Minneapolis
University of Minnesota alumni
Continental Cup of Curling participants
Twin sportspeople
American curling champions
21st-century American women